Pavoclinus is a genus of clinids found in the southeastern Atlantic and western Indian Ocean coastal waters of southern Africa.

Species
Nine recognized species are placed in this genus:
 Pavoclinus caeruleopunctatus Zsilavecz, 2001
 Pavoclinus graminis (Gilchrist & W. W. Thompson, 1908) (grass klipfish)
 Pavoclinus laurentii (Gilchrist & W. W. Thompson, 1908) (rippled klipfish)
 Pavoclinus litorafontis M. L. Penrith, 1965 (slinky klipfish)
 Pavoclinus mentalis (Gilchrist & W. W. Thompson, 1908) (bearded klipfish)
 Pavoclinus myae Christensen, 1978 (Mya's klipfish)
 Pavoclinus pavo (Gilchrist & W. W. Thompson, 1908) (peacock klipfish)
 Pavoclinus profundus J. L. B. Smith, 1961 (deepwater klipfish)
 Pavoclinus smalei Heemstra & J. E. Wright, 1986 (deep-reef klipfish)

References

 
Clinidae